The scaly laughingthrush (Trochalopteron subunicolor) is a bird species in the family Leiothrichidae.

It is found in Bhutan, China, India, Myanmar, Nepal, and Vietnam. Its natural habitat is subtropical or tropical moist montane forests.

References

 BirdLife International 2004.  Garrulax subunicolor.   2006 IUCN Red List of Threatened Species.   Downloaded on 25 July 2000.

scaly laughingthrush
Birds of Nepal
Birds of Bhutan
Birds of Northeast India
Birds of Myanmar
Birds of Yunnan
scaly laughingthrush
scaly laughingthrush
Taxonomy articles created by Polbot